Ignace Guédé-Gba (10 October 1964 – 29 December 2021) was an Ivorian footballer who played as a forward.

Guédé-Gba played in five matches for the Ivory Coast national team from 1983 to 1989. He was named in the Ivory Coast's squad for the 1988 African Cup of Nations tournament. He died on 29 December 2021, at the age of 57.

References

External links
 

1964 births
2021 deaths
Ivorian footballers
Association football forwards
Ivory Coast international footballers
1984 African Cup of Nations players
1988 African Cup of Nations players
Place of birth missing